WKKS-FM (104.9 FM) is a radio station  broadcasting an adult contemporary format. Licensed to Vanceburg, Kentucky, United States.  The station is currently owned by Brown Communications, Inc.

History
The station went on the air as WITD on 1981-12-07.  on 1982-07-16, the station changed its call sign to the current WKKS .

References

External links

KKS-FM